Dossena is an Italian comune.

Dossena may also refer to:

 Cosimo Dossena (1547–1620), Italian Roman Catholic Bishop of Tortona from 1612 to 1620

 Alberto Dossena (born 1998), Italian football player 
 Alceo Dossena (1878–1937), Italian sculptor
 Andrea Dossena (born 1981), Italian footballer
 Emilio Giuseppe Dossena (1903–1987), Italian painter 
 Giuseppe Dossena (born 1958), Italian football manager
 Luigi Dossena (1925–2007), Italian archbishop and Vatican diplomat
 Paolo Dossena (born 1942), Italian record producer, lyricist, arranger and composer
 Renato Dossena (born 1987), Italian footballer who plays as a goalkeeper 
 Sara Dossena (born 1984), Italian female long-distance runner
 Tiziano Thomas Dossena (born 1952), Italian American author and art critic